Rising Damp is a 1980 comedy film based on the British situation comedy Rising Damp, which aired on ITV from 1974 to 1978. The television series was, in turn, adapted from Eric Chappell's stage play The Banana Box. Chappell adapted the play to television, and wrote the screenplay for this feature film. The film's director was Joseph McGrath.

Leonard Rossiter plays Rupert Rigsby, the middle-aged landlord of a decrepit townhouse. Rigsby has fallen for his only female tenant, Ruth Jones (Frances de la Tour). Ruth, however, prefers Philip, who is much younger, more attractive, and more sophisticated than either Rigsby or she. Philip (Don Warrington) is not especially interested in Ruth, but he eggs Rigsby on in order to humiliate him.

In adapting the television series to film, the setting was changed from Yorkshire to inner-city London. As Richard Beckinsale had died the year before, his character of Alan was rewritten with Christopher Strauli cast as a new character, art student John. The character of Alan is briefly referred to as having left Rigsby's house. In the film adaptation, Denholm Elliott plays Charles Seymour, a con-man with upper class affectations who courts Ruth in pursuit of her money. Though initially enamoured of his perceived social status, Rigsby becomes suspicious when Seymour consistently fails to pay his rent. Philip has the same suspicions regarding Seymour's true agenda and finally confronts him. With Rigsby eavesdropping on the conversation, Seymour threatens to expose Philip as a native Briton rather than the African prince he has long claimed to be if he reveals what he knows. Enraged, Rigsby appears from behind a door and unleashes a barrage of abuse on Seymour before finally throwing him out. Then calmer, he assures Philip he believes nothing of Seymour's story, and concludes that everything in Philip's demeanor suggests he is indeed descended from African royalty.

For her performance as Ruth Jones, Frances da la Tour received an Evening Standard British Film Award in the category of "Best Actress".

Cast
Leonard Rossiter as Rigsby
Frances de la Tour as Miss Jones
Don Warrington as Philip Smith
Christopher Strauli as John Harris
Denholm Elliott as Charles Seymour
Carrie Jones as Sandra Cooper
Glynn Edwards as Mr. Cooper
John Cater as Bert
Derek Griffiths as Alec
Ronnie Brody as Italian Waiter
Alan Clare as Accordionist
Pat Roach as Rugby Player
Jonathan Cecil as Boutique Assistant
Bill Dean as Workman

Critical reception
A reviewer for Time Out wrote that the film "[demonstrates] that moderately droll TV boarding-house sitcoms ought not to be stretched to 98 minutes."

David Parkinson wrote in the Radio Times, "the absence of Richard Beckinsale does much to sap the enjoyment of this decent movie version of the enduring television sitcom. Eric Chappell...overwrites to compensate and the film suffers from too many padded scenes and too few hilarious situations. Newcomer Denholm Elliott looks a tad out of place alongside regulars Frances de la Tour and Don Warrington, but he makes a solid foil for the magnificent Leonard Rossiter, who pursues his romantic quest with a seedy chivalry that both disgusts and amuses."

See also
 Man About the House (film)
 Are You Being Served? (film)
 Porridge (film)

External links
 Rising Damp The Movie at "Oh...Miss Jones!"

References

1980 films
1980 comedy films
British comedy films
Films based on television series
Films set in London
Films set in the 1970s
Films directed by Joseph McGrath (film director)
1980s English-language films
1980s British films